Najlepšie dievčatá is the fifth studio album by Modus, released on OPUS in 1984.

Track listing

Official releases
 1984: Najlepšie dievčatá, LP, MC, CD, OPUS, #9113 1549
 1985: The Best Girls, LP, MC, OPUS, #9113 1587

Credits and personnel
 Ján Lehotský – lead vocal, chorus, writer, keyboards
 Marián Greksa - lead vocal
 Ľuboš Stankovský - lead vocal
 Kamil Peteraj – lyrics

See also
 The 100 Greatest Slovak Albums of All Time

References

General

Specific

External links 
 

1984 albums
Modus (band) albums